Pasi Häkkinen (born June 25, 1977) is a Finnish former ice hockey goaltender.

Career
Häkkinen started his pro career with SaiPa in the Finnish SM-liiga, and was the backup goalie for Jokerit for the 2004–2005 season, when he won the silver medal with the club. He was their #1 goaltender in the previous season, and has signed with a Danish team for the 2005–2006 season. Häkkinen has also spent a year with the Nottingham Panthers in the British league. In 2015 he became a coach of Hokki.

Career statistics

Regular season

References

External links

1977 births
Living people
People from Lappeenranta
Bolzano HC players
Dresdner Eislöwen players
ESV Kaufbeuren players
EV Landshut players
Finnish ice hockey goaltenders
FoPS players
HC Salamat players
Herning Blue Fox players
HK Gomel players
Hokki players
Ilves players
Jokerit players
KooKoo players
Lempäälän Kisa players
Lukko players
Nottingham Panthers players
SaiPa players
SønderjyskE Ishockey players
Starbulls Rosenheim players
Sportspeople from South Karelia